Surendra Prasad Singh was a Nepalese judge who served as 9th Chief Justice of Nepal, in office from 26 September 1995 to 14 February 1997. He was appointed by the then-king of Nepal, Birendra.

Singh was preceded by Bishwonath Upadhyaya and succeeded by Trilok Pratap Rana.

References 

Chief justices of Nepal